Cenn Fáelad mac Ailella (alias Cennfaeladh) (died 679) was an early medieval Irish scholar renowned for having his memory markedly improve and possibly becoming eidetic after suffering a head wound in battle.

Ancestry
He was a member of the Cenél nEógain, being a grandson of King Báetán mac Muirchertaig (King of Cenél nEógain), a great-great-great-great grandson of Niall Noígiallach, and a first cousin once removed of Aldfrith of Northumbria via his first cousin, Fina.

His father Ailill mac Báetán was murdered in Templeport in modern-day County Cavan, Republic of Ireland, according to the Annals of Ulster: "U620.1. The slaying in Magh Slécht in the territory of Connacht of the kindred of Báetán, i.e. of Ailill son of Báetán and of Mael Dúin son of Fergus son of Báetán; and the death of Fiachra son of Ciarán son of Ainmire son of Sétna." According to John Healy, Cenn Fáelad's sister Sabina was the mother of Saint Cuthbert of Lindisfarne.

Cath Magh Rath
Cenn Fáelad fought at the crucial Battle of Moira or Magh Rath (Moira, County Down, Northern Ireland) in 636. During the battle he received a life-threatening head wound, and was afterwards carried to the abbey of Tomregan, County Cavan to be healed in the house of its abbot, Saint Bricín. That this abbey was situated beside Magh Slécht where his father had been slain 16 years earlier may not be a coincidence. His family possibly had land there. This house was situated "where the three streets meet between the houses of the three professors. And there were three schools in the place; a school of Latin learning, a school of Irish law and a school of Irish poetry. And everything that he would hear of the recitations of the three schools every day he would have by heart every night."

This merging of Latin learning, native Irish law and vernacular poetry, ensured Cenn Fáelad's place in Irish legal tradition in his own time and beyond. He is quoted in the Bretha Nemed Toisech in the section dealing with the Church, thus demonstrating the compatibility of ecclesiastical learning with native learning.

The Scholar
Tradition states that as a result of a head wound, Cenn Fáelad's "brain of forgetting was knocked out of him." The effect of this trauma led him to create "a pattern of poetry to these matters and he wrote them on slates and tablets and set them in a vellum book."

The Suidigud Tellaig Temra recounts that because of his vast store of lore, when Diarmait mac Cerbaill wished to establish the original boundaries of Tara, he had recourse to Cenn Fáelad. But even his knowledge did not go back that far in time, and he gathers all the wisest men of Ireland. When they, in turn, cannot provide an answer, he they consult Fintan mac Bóchra, one of the original settlers, miraculously still alive.

His verses were all composed in quatrains of numbered syllables with regular rhyme, and moderate use of alliteration, in contrast to a more archaic form that was still practised in the south of Ireland at the time (i.e., Leinster and Munster). Most or all of his historical verse relate to his own dynasty, the Cenél nEógain.

He was the first poet quoted in the Irish annals, being referred to as sapiens, a technical term denoting a head teacher or professor in a monastic school (though not necessarily a monk himself). Later manuscripts of legal and grammatical texts were attributed to him, though the earliest of them seem to date from about fifty years after his death.

Robin Flower stated "How far these are really his may be a matter of controversy, but there can be little real doubt that the writings by him existed in the period when the vernacular learning was being eagerly cultivated."

A copy of one of the works attributed to him exists in Trinity College, Dublin Ms 1317, written by the grandfather of Dubhaltach Mac Fhirbhisigh.

Edward O'Reilly gives a full account of his works in his 'Irish Writers', LXIV sq.; d. anno 678.

References

Further reading

The Encyclopedia of Ireland, 2003; .
The Irish Tradition, Robin Flower, 1947: 
O'Reilly, Eugene & O'Reilly, John: Saint Bricin of Tomregan, pp. 464–488, in Breifne Journal, Volume VII, Number 25,1987.
Eugene O'Curry: On the Manners and Customs of the Ancient Irish, pp. 92–95.
Full text of "On the Manners and Customs of the Ancient Irish" in various formats (PDF, JP2, etc)
Eugene O'Curry: Lectures on the Manuscript Materials of Ancient Irish History, pp. 48–51 and 418–419.
Full text of "Lectures on the Manuscript Materials of Ancient Irish History" in various formats (PDF, JP2, etc)
John O'Donovan: Cath Muighe Rath, pp. 279–285
Full text of "Cath Muighe Rath" in various formats (PDF, JP2, etc)
Book of Aicill
Auraicept na N-Éces (The Scholar's Primer)
Full text of the "Auraicept na N-Éces" (Calder's 1917 edition) in various formats (PDF, JP2, etc)
David Georgi: A Stunning Blow on the Head: Literacy and the Anxiety of Memory in the Legend of Cenn Faelad's Brain of Forgetting, in Proceedings of the Harvard Celtic Colloquium, Vol. 16/17, (1996/1997), pp. 195–205. Published by: Department of Celtic Languages & Literatures, Harvard University *
Eoin Macneill: A Pioneer of Nations *
Philip O'Connell: The Diocese of Kilmore, pp 116–121
Full text of "The Diocese of Kilmore"
"Why Cenn Faelad 'lost' his 'Brain of Forgetting' ".  Hildegard L.C. Tristram (Hrsg.), Germans, Celts and Irish (anniversary publication for Gearóid Mac Eoin), Hamburg: Buske 1990, 207–248.

7th-century Irish poets
Irish soldiers
Irish Christian monks
7th-century Christian saints
Medieval Irish saints
Medieval Irish historians
7th-century historians
679 deaths
7th-century Irish writers
People from County Cavan
7th-century Latin writers
Year of birth unknown
Irish male poets